Burnside State High School is a secondary education institution in Burnside, Queensland, Australia, with 425 students (as of 2010) that caters for grades 7 through to 12. The school was opened in 1979.

STEMM programme 
Burnside State High School is a participant in the Supporting Teenagers with Education Mothering and Mentoring (STEMM) programme. STEMM enables a pathway for pregnant girls and young mothers to achieve educational goals as well as providing parenting support, mentoring and community access. STEMM offers a course in the fundamentals of literacy and numeracy for girls to achieve year 10 competency.

See also

List of schools in Sunshine Coast, Queensland

References

External links 
 Burnside State High School
 Next Step Survey Results, Year 12 2009 Student Destinations, Burnside State High School (accessed 7 May 2011)

Public high schools in Queensland
Schools on the Sunshine Coast, Queensland
Educational institutions established in 1979
1979 establishments in Australia